Daniel Davidson (born January 8, 1981) is a former Major League Baseball pitcher.

Davidson is 6 ft 4in tall and weighs 225 lbs.

Education
While playing college baseball, Davidson obtained a degree in Teaching as well as gaining experience in baseball coaching.

Career
Before moving to Los Angeles, Davidson played for Florida State University, Gulf Coast Community College, and, after not signing in 1999 and 2000 to two different teams, he was selected by the Anaheim Angels in the 13th Round (390th overall) of the 2003 amateur entry draft.

Davidson made his major league debut against the Minnesota Twins on April 19, at the Hubert H. Humphrey Metrodome, pitching one inning and giving up one walk. On April 26, 2009, Davidson was designated for assignment. 
He is now a middle school teacher in his hometown of Panama City, FL.

References

External links

1983 births
Living people
Major League Baseball pitchers
Baseball players from Florida
Rancho Cucamonga Quakes players
Arkansas Travelers players
Salt Lake Bees players
Provo Angels players
Los Angeles Angels players
Gulf Coast State Commodores baseball players
Florida State Seminoles baseball players
People from Panama City, Florida